Lucia Sardo (born 13 December 1952) is an Italian actress.

Life and career 
Born Aurora Sardo in Francofonte, Syracuse, Sardo formed at the Teatro di Ventura under Ferruccio Merisi. She made her film debut in the 1992 Aurelio Grimaldi's drama Acla's Descent into Floristella, then she got her first major role two years later, in Grimaldi's The Whores. Her breakout came in 2001, with the role of Felicia, Giuseppe Impastato's mother, in Marco Tullio Giordana's One Hundred Steps;  for her performance she was nominated for Nastro d'Argento in the "supporting actress" category.

Filmography

References

External links 

 

1952 births
Living people
People from Francofonte
Italian film actresses
Italian television actresses
Italian stage actresses
Actors from Sicily